Lust (translit. El Shoq) is a 2010 Egyptian drama film directed by Khaled El Hagar. The film was selected as the Egyptian entry for the Best Foreign Language Film at the 84th Academy Awards, but it did not make the final shortlist.

Cast
 Ruby as Shoq
 Ahmed Azmi as Hussin
 Sawsan Badr as Fatma

See also
 List of submissions to the 84th Academy Awards for Best Foreign Language Film
 List of Egyptian submissions for the Academy Award for Best Foreign Language Film

References

External links
 

2010 films
2010s Arabic-language films
2010 drama films
Egyptian drama films